Succession is an American satirical black comedy-drama television series created by Jesse Armstrong. It premiered on June 3, 2018, on HBO. The series centers on the Roy family, the owners of Waystar RoyCo, a global media and entertainment conglomerate, who are fighting for control of the company amid uncertainty about the health of the family's patriarch, Logan Roy (Brian Cox). The series has been renewed for a fourth and final season, which is set to premiere on March 26, 2023.

Among the series's cast are Jeremy Strong as Kendall, Kieran Culkin as Roman, and Sarah Snook as Siobhan ("Shiv"), Logan's children employed by the company. Matthew Macfadyen stars as Tom Wambsgans, Shiv's husband and Waystar executive; Nicholas Braun as Greg Hirsch, Logan's grandnephew also employed by the company; Alan Ruck as Connor, Logan's eldest child; and Hiam Abbass as Marcia Roy, Logan's third and current wife. Peter Friedman, Natalie Gold, and Rob Yang also star, while Dagmara Domińczyk, Arian Moayed, J. Smith-Cameron, Justine Lupe, David Rasche, and Fisher Stevens featured in recurring roles before being promoted to the main cast.

Succession has received widespread critical acclaim for its writing, acting, musical score, production values, and examination of its subject matter. The series has received several awards and nominations, including the British Academy Television Award for Best International Programme and two wins for both, the Golden Globe for Best Television Series – Drama and the Primetime Emmy for Outstanding Drama Series in 2020 and 2022. Both Cox and Strong received the Golden Globe for Best Actor – Television Series Drama and Snook the Golden Globe for Best Supporting Actress – Series, Miniseries or Television Film, with Strong and Macfadyen receiving Primetime Emmy Awards for their performances – in addition to Armstrong's three wins for Outstanding Writing for a Drama Series.

Premise
Succession follows the Roy family, owners of media conglomerate Waystar RoyCo. The family patriarch, Logan Roy (Cox), has experienced a decline in health. His four children – estranged oldest son Connor (Ruck), power-hungry Kendall (Strong), irreverent Roman (Culkin), and politically-savvy Shiv (Snook) – all with varying degrees of connection to the company, begin to prepare for a future without their father, and each begins vying for prominence within the company.

Cast and characters

 Hiam Abbass as Marcia Roy (seasons 1–2; recurring: seasons 3–4), Logan Roy's third and current wife. Born and raised in Beirut, she is often at odds with Logan's children, whose trust she has yet to earn. She has a son, Amir, from her first marriage and a daughter from a previous relationship. 
 Nicholas Braun as Greg Hirsch, the bumbling and sweet yet opportunistic grandson of Logan Roy's brother, Ewan. Greg is unfamiliar with the rough terrain he must navigate to win Logan over, and finds himself indentured to Tom Wambsgans in his quest for a place at Waystar and with the family.
 Brian Cox as Logan Roy, the Dundee-born billionaire founder of media and entertainment conglomerate Waystar RoyCo. He is a brash leader whose primary focus is his company rather than his four children: Connor, from his first marriage, and Kendall, Roman and Siobhan, from his second marriage. He is married to Marcia, his third wife.
 Kieran Culkin as Roman Roy, half-brother to Connor and the middle child from Logan Roy's second marriage. Roman is immature, does not take responsibilities seriously and often finds himself lacking the common sense his father requires of him. This is likely because, as evidenced in many episodes, his father's abuse targeted him. He is frequently at odds with his older brother Kendall and sometimes his sister Shiv, with whom he often vies for power and their father's attention.
 Peter Friedman as Frank Vernon, COO and later vice-chairman of Waystar RoyCo, and longtime confidant of Logan Roy. Frank is a member of Logan's old guard, on whom Kendall frequently relies to help win back Logan's favor. He is Kendall's mentor and godfather, and is disliked by Roman.
 Natalie Gold as Rava Roy (season 1; recurring: seasons 3–4), Kendall's former wife and mother of his two children.
 Matthew Macfadyen as Tom Wambsgans, Shiv's fiancé and then her husband; a Waystar executive who is promoted from heading the amusement park and cruise division to running ATN, the company's global news outlet. He enjoys his proximity to the Roy family's power but is frequently dismissed by the family's inner circle. He ingratiates himself with those more powerful than he, but torments his hapless subordinate, Greg Hirsch.
 Alan Ruck as Connor Roy, the only child from Logan Roy's first marriage. Mostly removed from corporate affairs, he defers to his half-siblings on most firm-related matters and resides at a ranch in New Mexico with his younger girlfriend Willa. He is prone to delusions of grandeur and "had an interest in politics from a young age". Similar to his half-siblings, Connor does not have the best recollections of his childhood, as he mentioned that he went three years without seeing his dad, Logan,  when he was a kid.
 Sarah Snook as Siobhan "Shiv" Roy, Logan Roy's youngest child and only daughter. A left-leaning political fixer, she worked for a time for presidential candidate Gil Eavis, whose political views clash with Waystar. She eventually leaves politics to focus on building a future at Waystar. She is engaged to and then marries Tom Wambsgans, but their relationship is undermined by Shiv's infidelity.
 Jeremy Strong as Kendall Roy, half-brother to Connor and the eldest child from Logan Roy's second marriage. As Logan's heir apparent, Kendall struggles to prove his worth to his father after battling substance abuse and bungling major deals. He toils to maintain a relationship with his siblings, ex-wife Rava, and their children.
 Rob Yang as Lawrence Yee (seasons 1–2), the founder of media website Vaulter that is acquired by Waystar RoyCo. He holds great contempt for Waystar and particularly Kendall, with whom he is often at odds.
 Dagmara Domińczyk as Karolina Novotney (seasons 2–4; recurring: season 1), the head of PR for Waystar RoyCo and a member of the company's legal team.
 Arian Moayed as Stewy Hosseini (season 2; recurring seasons 1, 3–4), Kendall's friend from The Buckley School and Harvard who is now a private-equity investor with a seat on Waystar's board. He is covertly in partnership with Logan's rival Sandy Furness.
 J. Smith-Cameron as Gerri Kellman (seasons 2–4; recurring: season 1), the general counsel to Waystar RoyCo, who is also godmother to Shiv. She becomes a mentor figure to Roman, with whom she also shares a secret sexual connection.
 Justine Lupe as Willa Ferreyra (seasons 3–4; recurring: seasons 1–2), Connor Roy's younger girlfriend who is a former call girl and an aspiring playwright. 
 David Rasche as Karl Muller (seasons 3–4; recurring: seasons 1–2), Waystar RoyCo's chief financial officer and member of the company's legal team. 
 Fisher Stevens as Hugo Baker (seasons 3–4; recurring: season 2), a senior communications executive for Parks and Cruises in charge of managing a scandal involving Brightstar cruise lines.

Episodes

Season 1 (2018)

Season 2 (2019)

Season 3 (2021)

Season 4 (2023)

Production

Development
Showrunner Jesse Armstrong initially conceived the series as a feature film about the Murdoch family, but the script never went into production. Armstrong eventually expanded the scope of the story to include the larger landscape of Wall Street, which he felt better suited a television format. Armstrong wrote a new script centered on original characters loosely inspired by various powerful media families such as the Murdochs, the Redstones and the Sulzbergers. On June 6, 2016, it was announced that HBO had given the production a pilot order. The episode was written by Armstrong and directed by Adam McKay. Executive producers for the pilot include Armstrong, McKay, Will Ferrell, Frank Rich, and Kevin Messick. On May 16, 2017, it was announced that HBO had given the production a series order for a first season consisting of ten episodes. The previously announced creative team continued their involvement as the series entered into production.

On November 17, 2017, it was reported that Nicholas Britell would serve as the series' composer. On April 26, 2018, it was announced that the series would premiere on June 3, 2018. 

On June 11, 2018, HBO renewed the series for a second season. On May 23, 2019, it was announced that the second season would premiere on August 11, 2019.

On August 20, 2019, HBO renewed the series for a third season. On March 28, 2020, HBO announced the third season's production was delayed due to the COVID-19 pandemic. The third season premiered on October 17, 2021. 

In June 2021, executive producer Georgia Pritchett commented that the series would not go beyond five seasons, and possibly would end after season four. On October 26, 2021, HBO renewed the series for a fourth season, set to premiere on March 26, 2023. In an interview with The New Yorker in February 2023, Armstrong confirmed that the series would conclude with the fourth season. He stated that while the season was not initially pitched as the series' last, "the decision to end solidified through the writing and even when we started filming: I said to the cast, 'I’m not a hundred percent sure, but I think this is it.'"

Casting
On October 6, 2016, it was announced that Brian Cox, Jeremy Strong, Kieran Culkin, Sarah Snook, Nicholas Braun, and Matthew Macfadyen had been cast in lead roles in the series' pilot. On November 4, 2016, it was announced that Hiam Abbass, Alan Ruck, Rob Yang, Parker Sawyers, and Peter Friedman had also joined the main cast of the pilot. On January 24, 2018, it was reported that Ashley Zukerman had joined the series in a recurring role. 

On May 21, 2019, Holly Hunter joined the cast in a recurring role in the second season.

In January 2021, it was announced Sanaa Lathan, Linda Emond and Jihae had joined the cast of the series in recurring roles in the third season. In February 2021, it was reported that Hope Davis was cast in a recurring role in the third season. In March, Dasha Nekrasova was reported to have a recurring role in the third season. In May 2021, Alexander Skarsgård was cast in a recurring role while Adrien Brody was cast to guest star for the third season. In August 2021, it was announced Ella Rumpf would guest star in the third season.

In January 2023, it was announced that Adam Godley, Annabeth Gish, Eili Harboe and Jóhannes Haukur Jóhannesson were cast in the fourth season.

Filming

The series is primarily filmed in New York City, and shot on 35 mm film. Director Adam McKay filmed the pilot in late 2016, while principal photography for the rest of the first season of the series began in October 2017. Locations used throughout the series include the American Irish Historical Society on Fifth Avenue as the location for Logan's apartment, 714 Broadway as the location of Shiv's season 1 apartment, and the Downtown Manhattan Heliport on the East River for scenes of the Roys departing on their helicopters. For scenes depicting the interiors of the Waystar RoyCo offices, the crew uses towers 4 and 7 of the World Trade Center, while 28 Liberty Street is used for exterior shots. Silvercup Studios in Queens houses many of the sets used for the series.

Other filming locations for the first season included Bellevue Hospital (where the second episode took place), the Cunard Building on 25 Broadway (which houses Cipriani S.A., the venue for a gala in the fourth episode), the East New York Freight Tunnel (the entrance of a bachelor party in the eighth episode), and the Financial District of Manhattan. From mid-to-end of January 2018, the production moved from New York to New Mexico for the episode "Austerlitz", which was primarily filmed in Santa Fe. On February 22, 2018, filming took place in New Jersey which required the closing of the Atlantic City-Brigantine tunnel. On February 25, 2018, filming took place at Eastnor Castle near Ledbury in Herefordshire, England, which served as the setting for the last two episodes of the season.

The second season saw a significant increase in location shifts. The opening scenes of the season premiere were shot on location in Iceland, while Henry Ford II's 1960 estate in the Hamptons was used as the Roys' summer home. Oheka Castle in Huntington, New York, stood in for the Roys' hunting lodge in Hungary for the episode "Hunting". Filming also took place in Long Island, with a mansion once belonging to Junius Spencer Morgan featuring prominently in the episode "Tern Haven". The estate is one of several in the area used as filming locations for the second season. From April through May 2019, the production recruited extras for filming in Lake Placid, and Lake George, New York, where the episode "Argestes" was shot. Production moved to Dundee for the eighth episode, with additional filming taking place in Glasgow and Ayr for the preceding episode (which takes place in England). Starting from July 17, 2019, the crew filmed in Korčula, Croatia, for the second-season finale episode "This Is Not for Tears", including extensive scenes on a yacht.

Filming for season 3, which was slated to begin in April 2020, was postponed due to the COVID-19 pandemic. In early November 2020, star Alan Ruck announced that filming would begin in mid-November in New York City. The season had begun filming in New York as of December 2020. Filming locations in the city included the Woolworth Building in Tribeca, The Shed in Hudson Yards, and a number of hotels including the Marriott Marquis in Times Square and the Plaza Hotel on Fifth Avenue. Production also returned to the Hamptons, at locations including Montauk and Wainscott. In May, additional filming for season 3 took place in Richmond, Virginia, primarily at the Jefferson Hotel. In June, production on the third season moved to Italy for the final two episodes, with filming primarily taking place in the Val d'Orcia region of Tuscany – where a wedding reception was filmed at the estates La Foce and Villa Cetinale. Additional filming took place in other nearby comuni in the province of Siena – including Pienza, Montalcino and Chianciano Terme – as well as in Cortona, Lake Como, Milan, and Florence (the lattermost of which was used for establishing shots in the opening episodes).

Production on the 10-episode fourth season began in New York City on June 27, 2022, with Mark Mylod directing the first episode. In October 2022, it was confirmed that filming occurred in western Norway, including locations such as the Atlantic Ocean Road, Romsdalen Gondola and Juvet Landscape Hotel, as part of a storyline involving Skarsgård's character. The series also filmed in Los Angeles for the fourth season.

Music

Release
On April 27, 2018, the series held its official world premiere during the Series Mania Festival in Lille, France, in which the pilot episode was screened. On May 22, 2018, the series held its official US premiere at the Time Warner Center in New York City. HBO released a DVD version of season 1, branded Succession: The Complete First Season, on August 6, 2018, which included special features. A Blu-ray release was made available on November 6 of the same year.

HBO issued a DVD (no Blu-ray) release for season 2, branded Succession: The Complete Second Season, on September 15, 2020. 

A DVD (no Blu-ray) release for season 3, branded Succession: The Complete Third Season, was issued on May 17, 2022.

Reception

Critical response

The series has received an average score of 94% on Rotten Tomatoes and a score of 83 on Metacritic. In 2022, Rolling Stone ranked Succession number 11 on its list of the 100 greatest TV shows.

The first season was met with highly positive reviews from critics. On the review aggregation website Rotten Tomatoes, the season holds an approval rating of 89% with an average rating of 7.9 out of 10, based on 87 reviews. The website's critical consensus reads, "Peppering its pathos with acid wit, Succession is a divine comedy of absolute power and dysfunction – brought to vivid life by a ferocious ensemble." Metacritic, which uses a weighted average, assigned the season a score of 70 out of 100 based on 29 critics, indicating "generally favorable reviews".

The second season received high critical acclaim. On Rotten Tomatoes, the season holds a 97% rating with an average rating of 8.95 out of 10, based on 236 reviews. The website's critical consensus reads, "Succession returns in darkly funny form, with sharp writing, exceptional performances, and a surprising new level of sympathy for some of television's least likable characters." On Metacritic, the season has a weighted average score of 89 out of 100, based on 19 critics, indicating "universal acclaim".

The third season received widespread critical acclaim. On Rotten Tomatoes, the season holds a 97% approval rating with an average rating of 9.35 out of 10, based on 141 reviews. The website's critical consensus reads, "Fans already buying what Succession is selling will be pleasantly surprised to find its third season in crackling form – even if it gets a little too real from time to time." On Metacritic, the season has a weighted average score of 92 out of 100, based on 31 critics, indicating "universal acclaim".

Ratings
The series premiere episode drew 582,000 live viewers, down from the 1.39 million viewers that watched its lead-in, Westworld. The season 2 finale drew 1.1 million viewers across all viewing platforms. Season 3 premiered to 1.4 million viewers across various platforms and ended with 1.7 million viewers across all viewing platforms, a record high for the show.

Accolades

Succession has received numerous awards and nominations from various television award ceremonies. It has received 48 Primetime Emmy Award nominations with 13 wins. Its first season received five nominations at the 71st Primetime Emmy Awards, including Outstanding Drama Series, and Jesse Armstrong won for Outstanding Writing for a Drama Series for the episode "Nobody Is Ever Missing".

Its second season received 18 nominations with 7 wins at the 72nd Primetime Emmy Awards; including Outstanding Drama Series, Jeremy Strong for Outstanding Lead Actor in a Drama Series, Cherry Jones for Outstanding Guest Actress in a Drama Series, and for Outstanding Writing and Directing. Brian Cox, Matthew Macfadyen, Kieran Culkin, Nicholas Braun, Sarah Snook, James Cromwell, and Harriet Walter all received acting nominations.

Its third season received a leading 25 nominations with 4 wins at the 74th Primetime Emmy Awards; including Outstanding Drama Series, Macfadyen for Outstanding Supporting Actor in a Drama Series, and Armstrong for Outstanding Writing for a Drama Series. Cox, Strong, Culkin, Braun, Snook, Cromwell, and Walter all received repeat nominations, while J. Smith-Cameron, Adrien Brody, Arian Moayed, Alexander Skarsgård, Hope Davis, and Sanaa Lathan all received acting nominations as well. The series also received three nominations for Outstanding Directing for a Drama Series.

Podcast
In July 2020, HBO launched a companion podcast, "HBO's Succession Podcast". The first season featured British-American broadcaster, podcaster, and filmmaker Roger Bennett interviewing members of the cast over eight episodes. The second season featured American journalist Kara Swisher discussing with guests how season three plot points tied to real world events.

Notes

References

External links
 
 

 
2010s American black comedy television series
2010s American comedy-drama television series
2010s American satirical television series
2018 American television series debuts
2020s American black comedy television series
2020s American comedy-drama television series
2020s American satirical television series
Best Drama Series Golden Globe winners
English-language television shows
HBO original programming
Mass media portrayals of the upper class
Peabody Award-winning television programs
Primetime Emmy Award for Outstanding Drama Series winners
Serial drama television series
Television productions suspended due to the COVID-19 pandemic
Television series about dysfunctional families
Television series about siblings
Television series by Gary Sanchez Productions
Television series by Home Box Office
Television shows filmed in Croatia
Television shows filmed in England
Television shows filmed in Iceland
Television shows filmed in Italy
Television shows filmed in Los Angeles
Television shows filmed in New Jersey
Television shows filmed in New Mexico
Television shows filmed in New York (state)
Television shows filmed in New York City
Television shows filmed in Norway
Television shows filmed in Scotland
Television shows filmed in Virginia
Television shows set in New York City